Michałowo is a town in Podlaskie Voivodeship in north-eastern Poland.

Michałowo may also refer to the following places:
Michałowo, part of the district of Nowe Miasto in Poznań
Michałowo, Gostyń County in Greater Poland Voivodeship (west-central Poland)
Michałowo, Słupca County in Greater Poland Voivodeship (west-central Poland)
Michałowo, Środa Wielkopolska County in Greater Poland Voivodeship (west-central Poland)
Michałowo, Aleksandrów County in Kuyavian-Pomeranian Voivodeship (north-central Poland)
Michałowo, Lipno County in Kuyavian-Pomeranian Voivodeship (north-central Poland)
Michałowo, Włocławek County in Kuyavian-Pomeranian Voivodeship (north-central Poland)
Michałowo, Gmina Czarnia in Masovian Voivodeship (east-central Poland)
Michałowo, Gmina Goworowo in Masovian Voivodeship (east-central Poland)
Michałowo, Płońsk County in Masovian Voivodeship (east-central Poland)
Michałowo, Malbork County in Pomeranian Voivodeship (north Poland)
Michałowo, Słupsk County in Pomeranian Voivodeship (north Poland)
Michałowo, Warmian-Masurian Voivodeship (north Poland)

See also
Michałów (disambiguation)